The Finnish Aesthetic Group Gymnastics Championships is an annual aesthetic group gymnastics national competition in Finland.

Senior category

Junior category

References

Aesthetic group gymnastics
Gymnastics competitions in Finland
National championships in Finland